This is a complete list of the Flags used in the island of Cyprus. for the national flags, see The Flag of Cyprus, The Flag of Northern Cyprus and The Flag of Akrotiri and Dhekelia

National Flags

Government Flags

Political flags

Ethnic Group Flags

Municipality flag

Military Flags

Historical Flags

Proposed Flags

Northern Cyprus

See also 

 Flag of Cyprus
 Flag of Northern Cyprus
 Flag of Akrotiri and Dhekelia
 Coat of arms of Cyprus
 Flag of Greece
 Flag of Turkey

References 

Lists and galleries of flags
Flags
Flags